Wabasca 166 is an Indian reserve of the Bigstone Cree Nation in Alberta, located within the Municipal District of Opportunity No. 17. It is 80 kilometres north of Slave Lake. In the 2016 Canadian Census, it recorded a population of 160 living in 42 of its 49 total private dwellings.

References

Indian reserves in Alberta